The Forbidden Valley is a 1920 American silent drama romance film directed by J. Stuart Blackton and starring May McAvoy, Bruce Gordon and William R. Dunn.

Cast
 May McAvoy as Morning Glory
 Bruce Gordon as Jack Winslow
 William R. Dunn as Dave
 Charles Kent as	Ben Lee
 Warren Chandler as Dominie Jones
 Nellie Anderson as 	Aunt Endor
 Gene Layman as 	Sentimental Joe
 Emil Link as 	Cal Mitchell
Harry Kiefer as His Son

References

Bibliography
 Connelly, Robert B. The Silents: Silent Feature Films, 1910-36, Volume 40, Issue 2. December Press, 1998.
 Munden, Kenneth White. The American Film Institute Catalog of Motion Pictures Produced in the United States, Part 1. University of California Press, 1997.

External links
 

1920 films
1920 drama films
1920s English-language films
American silent feature films
Silent American drama films
American black-and-white films
Pathé Exchange films
Films directed by J. Stuart Blackton
1920s American films
Silent romantic drama films
1920 romantic drama films
American romantic drama films